Achoma District is one of twenty districts of the province Caylloma in Peru.

See also 
 Ananta

References

Districts of the Caylloma Province
Districts of the Arequipa Region